L'Auberge Casino & Hotel Baton Rouge is a casino in Baton Rouge, Louisiana. The casino opened in September 2012, and has  of gaming space. It is owned by Gaming and Leisure Properties and operated by Penn Entertainment.

The casino has 1,500 slot machines, 50 table games, and a poker room.  The hotel has 12 stories, 205 rooms, a rooftop pool, and a fitness center.

In April 2016, Pinnacle Entertainment sold the property to Gaming and Leisure Properties and leased it back, along with almost all of Pinnacle's real estate assets. Penn National Gaming (now Penn Entertainment) acquired Pinnacle in October 2018, including the operations of L'Auberge Baton Rouge.

References

External links

Casinos in Louisiana
Casino hotels
2012 establishments in Louisiana